Edward Geiser Dailey (May 5, 1933 — July 2, 2018) was an American ophthalmologist and tennis player.

Born in Harrisburg, Pennsylvania, Dailey played varsity tennis while at Princeton University. His fourth round appearance at the 1959 U.S. National Championships was his best performance at the tournament and ended in a loss to Luis Ayala, the sixth-seed. He became an ophthalmologist and was the founder of Dailey Harvey Eye Associates in Camp Hill.

References

External links
 

1933 births
2018 deaths
American male tennis players
Princeton Tigers men's tennis players
Tennis people from Pennsylvania
Sportspeople from Harrisburg, Pennsylvania